The College Club of Boston is a private membership organization founded in 1890 as the first women's college club in the United States. Located in the historic Back Bay of Boston, Massachusetts at 44 Commonwealth Avenue, the College Club was established by nineteen college educated women whose mission was to form a social club where they and other like-minded women could meet and share companionship.

History
In December 1890, 76 Marlborough Street, also located in Boston's Back Bay, became the first home of The College Club. The building at 76 Marlborough was purchased by Club member Mabel Cummings in 1893. The Club was designed by Mary Almy.

In April 1905, the College Club acquired the clubhouse at 40 Commonwealth Avenue, which contained an Old English drawing room, a fine big cafe with a male chef, and seven bedrooms, each of which "were furnished and decorated in the colors of various women's colleges: crimson rambler wallpaper for Radcliffe, blue silk curtains for Wellesley, white (with brass beds) for Smith, dawn pink and gray for Vassar." At that time, the College Club served 600 members, which grew to 1,243 members by 1915.

In 1924, the Club purchased 44 Commonwealth Avenue, which was the family home of Royal E. Robbins, a major stockholder in the Waltham Watch Company, and once the home of American stage actress Maude Adams. The brownstone townhouse was built in 1864 and was designed in the High Victorian style.

Club members took up the cause of educational philanthropy in 1985 and established The College Club Scholarship Fund, Inc. as an IRS 501(c)(3) designated charitable organization. The endowed fund is administered by Club members. Each year since 1986, the Scholarship Fund has awarded college tuition assistance to deserving high school seniors from Boston Public Schools.

See also
 General Federation of Women's Clubs, founded 1890
 National American Woman Suffrage Association, founded 1890

References 
Notes

Sources

External links 
 Official website of The College Club of Boston
 Neighborhood of The College Club of Boston

Charities based in Massachusetts
Back Bay, Boston
Clubs and societies in Boston
Cultural history of Boston
Educational charities based in the United States
Financial endowments
Organizations established in 1890
Scholarships in the United States
Victorian architecture in Massachusetts
Women's clubs in the United States
History of women in Massachusetts
Women in Boston